Depot Island is a triangular ice-free 7 ha island 200 m off the coast of Evans Piedmont Glacier, in southern Victoria Land, Antarctica. It lies about 4 km north of Cape Ross and 10 km south-east of Tripp Island. The whole island has been designated an Important Bird Area (IBA) by BirdLife International because it supports a small colony of south polar skuas.

See also
 List of Antarctic and Subantarctic islands

References

 

Important Bird Areas of Antarctica
Seabird colonies
Islands of Victoria Land